The 2010 Dallas Cowboys season was the franchise's 51st season in the National Football League (NFL), and the second season playing their home games at Cowboys Stadium. After falling to the Minnesota Vikings in the divisional round of the 2009-10 NFL Playoffs, the Cowboys sought to defend their NFC East division title and contend for a Super Bowl Championship, particularly given that Super Bowl XLV would be played at Cowboys Stadium. However, this did not happen and after a 1–7 start Wade Phillips became the first coach in Cowboys history to be fired during the season. He was replaced by offensive coordinator Jason Garrett.  The Cowboys finished the season 6–10, 3rd place in the NFC East, and failed to reach the playoffs. However, under Garrett the team's record was 5–3 as compared to the 1–7 start under Phillips.

2010 draft class

Notes
The Cowboys traded their original first (#27) and third-round (#90) selections for the New England Patriots first (#24) and fourth-round (#119) selections.
The Cowboys traded their original second (#59) and fourth-round (#125) selection to the Philadelphia Eagles in exchange for a second-round (#55) selection.
The Cowboys traded their fourth-round (#119 acquired from New England) selection to the Miami Dolphins in exchange for fourth (#126) and sixth-round (#179) selections.
The Cowboys traded their original fifth-round (#158) selection to the Denver Broncos in exchange for guard Montrae Holland.

Staff

Rosters

Opening training camp roster

Week one roster

Final roster

Free agents
RFA: Restricted free-agent, UFA: Unrestricted free-agent, ERFA: Exclusive rights free agent

Schedule

Preseason
On February 24, 2010, the NFL announced that the Cowboys will face the Cincinnati Bengals in the Pro Football Hall of Fame Game at Fawcett Stadium in Canton, Ohio. The game occurred on Sunday, August 8, 2010, and was aired by NBC.

The remainder of the Cowboys' preseason schedule was announced on March 31, 2010.

Regular season

Standings
Division

Conference

Preseason results
Pro Football Hall of Fame Game – vs Cincinnati Bengals

Preseason Week 1 – vs Oakland Raiders

Preseason Week 2 – at San Diego Chargers

Preseason Week 3 – at Houston Texans

Preseason Week 4 – vs Miami Dolphins

Regular season results

Week 1: at Washington Redskins

The Dallas Cowboys began their season at FedExField on Sunday night against their NFC East rival, the Washington Redskins. The Cowboys trailed early in the first quarter as Redskins kicker Graham Gano got a 29-yard field goal. Dallas would then trail in the second quarter as cornerback DeAngelo Hall returned a fumble 25 yards for a touchdown.

In the third quarter, Dallas would finally get on the board as quarterback Tony Romo completed a 4-yard touchdown pass to wide receiver Miles Austin. Washington would respond in the fourth quarter as Gano made a 49-yard field goal. Afterwards, Romo threw what would have been the game-winning 13-yard touchdown pass to wide receiver Roy Williams, but a holding call on offensive tackle Alex Barron effectively ended the game.

With the loss, the Cowboys began their season at 0–1.

Week 2: vs. Chicago Bears

Hoping to rebound from their loss to the Redskins the Cowboys played at home ground for an NFC duel with the Bears. In the first quarter Dallas trailed early as kicker Robbie Gould nailed a 38-yard field goal. Then they replied with wide receiver Dez Bryant returning a punt 62 yards to the endzone for a touchdown. The Bears got the lead back when quarterback Jay Cutler made a 39-yard touchdown pass to tight end Greg Olsen. In the 2nd quarter the Cowboys replied again when quarterback Tony Romo made a 1-yard touchdown pass to running back Chris Gronkowski, but fell behind with Cutler making a 9-yard touchdown pass to wide receiver Devin Hester, followed by kicker Robbie Gould making a 40-yard field goal. In the third quarter Dallas would reply with kicker David Buehler nailing a 28-yard field goal. However, they continued to struggle in the fourth quarter when Cutler made a 3-yard touchdown pass to running back Matt Forte, but the Cowboys made the final score of the game when Buehler got a 48-yard field goal.

With the loss, Dallas fell to 0–2 for the first time since 2001 when they finished 5–11.

Week 3: at Houston Texans

Still looking for their first win, the Cowboys flew to Reliant Stadium for a Texas rivalry match against the Houston Texans. Dallas trailed early in the second quarter when kicker Neil Rackers hit a 24-yard field goal. Then they took the lead with running back Marion Barber getting a 1-yard touchdown run, followed by kicker David Buehler's 49-yard field goal. The Cowboys increased their lead in the third quarter when quarterback Tony Romo completed a 15-yard touchdown pass to wide receiver Roy E. Williams. Houston replied with Rackers nailing a 30-yard field goal, but Dallas continued to score when Romo found Williams again on a 63-yard touchdown pass. Then David Buehler made a 40-yard field goal. The Texans would finally score when quarterback Matt Schaub made a 7-yard touchdown pass to wide receiver Kevin Walter; the Texans' onside kick attempt was good, but an interception made by Dallas safety Danny McCray ended any chances of a Texans comeback.

With the win, Dallas went into its bye week at 1–2.

Week 5: vs. Tennessee Titans

Coming off their road win over the Texans, the Cowboys went home for a Week 5 interconference duel with the Tennessee Titans. Dallas trailed early in the first quarter as Titans quarterback Vince Young completed a 24-yard touchdown pass to wide receiver Nate Washington, followed by kicker Rob Bironas making a 52-yard field goal. The Cowboys answered with a 51-yard field goal from kicker David Buehler.  However, Tennessee came right back in the second quarter as Young found wide receiver Kenny Britt on a 12-yard touchdown pass. Dallas would strike back as quarterback Tony Romo hooked up with wide receiver Roy Williams on a 6-yard touchdown pass.

In the third quarter, the Cowboys tied the game as Romo found wide receiver Miles Austin on a 69-yard touchdown pass. However, the Titans would retake the lead on Bironas' 40-yard field goal. Dallas tied the game again in the fourth quarter as Buehler booted a 26-yard field goal, but Tennessee struck back as running back Chris Johnson got a 1-yard touchdown. Afterwards, the Cowboys would tie the game yet again as Romo found tight end Jason Witten on an 18-yard touchdown pass. However, the Titans continued to pound away as Johnson got another 1-yard touchdown run.

With the loss, Dallas fell to 1–3.

Week 6: at Minnesota Vikings

Hoping to rebound from their loss to the Titans, the Cowboys flew to the Hubert H. Humphrey Metrodome for a Week 6 duel with the Minnesota Vikings. Dallas delivered the opening punch in the first quarter as quarterback Tony Romo found wide receiver Roy Williams on a 15-yard touchdown pass. The Vikings answered with quarterback Brett Favre completed a 10-yard touchdown pass to wide receiver Greg Camarillo. In the second quarter, the Cowboys regained the lead as Romo and Williams hooked up with each other again on a 2-yard touchdown pass.

Minnesota took the lead in the third quarter as wide receiver Percy Harvin returned the half's opening kickoff 95 yards for a touchdown, followed by running back Adrian Peterson's 1-yard touchdown run. In the fourth quarter, Dallas tied the game as Romo connected with rookie wide receiver Dez Bryant on a 31-yard touchdown pass. The Vikings responded with kicker Ryan Longwell making a 38-yard field goal.

With only 5 seconds left in the game, the Cowboys attempted a lateral play, in a fashion similar to The Play, River City Relay, and the Music City Miracle. However, Romo was then flagged for throwing a forward pass after crossing the line of scrimmage, ending the game.

With the loss, the Cowboys fell to 1–4.

Week 7: vs. New York Giants

Trying to snap a two-game losing streak, the Cowboys went home for a Week 7 NFC East duel with the New York Giants on Monday night. Dallas got the opening strike in the first quarter as quarterback Tony Romo found tight end Jason Witten on a 4-yard touchdown run, followed by a 26-yard field goal from kicker David Buehler. The Giants answered with quarterback Eli Manning completing a 7-yard touchdown pass to wide receiver Hakeem Nicks. The Cowboys would add onto their lead in the second quarter as Buehler booted a 41-yard field goal, followed by rookie wide receiver Dez Bryant returning a punt 93 yards for a touchdown. New York took the lead with Manning throwing an 8-yard touchdown pass to Nicks and a 14-yard touchdown pass to wide receiver Steve Smith. Afterwards, the Giants closed out the half with kicker Lawrence Tynes getting a 53-yard field goal. During the half, Romo suffered a broken left clavicle on a completion from a blocking error.

Dallas' deficit increased in the third quarter as Manning completed a 25-yard touchdown pass to wide receiver Mario Manningham, followed by running back Brandon Jacobs getting a 30-yard touchdown run. The Cowboys began to rally in the fourth quarter as quarterback Jon Kitna found Bryant on a 15-yard touchdown pass (with a successful two-point conversion pass to Witten), yet New York answered with a 26-yard field goal from Tynes.  Dallas tried to rally as Kitna hooked up with Bryant again on a 15-yard touchdown pass. With the loss, the Cowboys fell to 1–5.

Week 8: vs. Jacksonville Jaguars

Hoping to break their current losing streak the Cowboys played on home ground for an interconference duel with the Jaguars. In the first quarter the Cowboys took the lead as kicker David Buehler hit a 34-yard field goal. But they fell behind with quarterback David Garrard getting a 10-yard touchdown pass to wide receiver Mike Sims-Walker. In the second quarter, the Cowboys struggled further with Garrard finding tight end Marcedes Lewis on a 42-yard touchdown pass, then in the third quarter he found wide receiver Mike Thomas on a 15-yard touchdown pass, and then he found Lewis again on a 9-yard touchdown pass. The Cowboys responded in the 4th quarter with running back Marion Barber getting a 1-yard touchdown run. But the Jaguars scored again with Garrard scrambling 2 yards to the endzone for a touchdown. The Cowboys replied with quarterback Jon Kitna making an 8-yard touchdown pass to tight end Jason Witten.

With the loss, Dallas fell to 1–6.

Week 9: at Green Bay Packers

Looking for their second win the Cowboys flew to Lambeau Field for an NFC duel with the Packers. The second quarter saw the Cowboys trail immediately after quarterback Aaron Rodgers got a 9-yard touchdown pass to running back Brandon Jackson. This was followed by Jackson making a 2-yard touchdown run, and with Rodgers completing an 8-yard touchdown pass to wide receiver Greg Jennings. The Cowboys struggled further after free safety Nick Collins recovered a fumble and ran 26 yards for a touchdown. The Cowboys would make their only score of the game with quarterback Jon Kitna making a 2-yard touchdown pass to wide receiver Dez Bryant. They fell further behind after Rodgers found wide receiver Jones on a 10-yard touchdown pass, and with Crosby hitting a 26-yard field goal. The Cowboys had more problems when Kitna's pass was intercepted by outside linebacker Clay Matthews and returned 62 yards for a touchdown.

With the loss, the Cowboys fell to 1–7. After the game, head coach Wade Phillips was fired and offensive coordinator Jason Garrett became the interim head coach.

Week 10: at New York Giants

Trying to snap a five-game losing streak, the Cowboys flew to New Meadowlands Stadium for a Week 10 NFC East rematch with the New York Giants. Dallas trailed in the first quarter as Giants kicker Lawrence Tynes made a 43-yard field goal. The Cowboys answered with quarterback Jon Kitna connecting to rookie wide receiver Dez Bryant on a 13-yard touchdown pass (with a blocked extra point). Dallas added onto their lead in the second quarter with a 22-yard field goal from kicker David Buehler, followed by rookie cornerback Bryan McCann returning an interception 101 yards for a touchdown and Buehler's 23-yard field goal. New York answered with Tynes making a 25-yard field goal.

The Cowboys continued its dominating day in the third quarter as Kitna found running back Felix Jones on a 71-yard touchdown pass. The Giants responded with quarterback Eli Manning completing a 5-yard touchdown pass to wide receiver Mario Manningham, yet Dallas rebounded with Kitna hooking up with wide receiver Miles Austin on a 24-yard touchdown pass. However, New York continued its persistent play with Manning completing a 35-yard touchdown pass to tight end Kevin Boss. Fortunately, the Cowboys' defense held its ground in the fourth quarter to preserve the victory.

The game was delayed in the third quarter for about fifteen minutes when the lights at the New Meadowlands Stadium went out. Since it was already dark outside in New Jersey by that time, it was totally dark in the stadium.

With the win, Dallas improved to 2–7.

Week 11: vs. Detroit Lions

The Cowboys' tenth game was an NFC duel with the Lions. In the first quarter the Cowboys pulled ahead with quarterback Jon Kitna making a 1-yard touchdown pass to wide receiver Dez Bryant. The Lions replied with kicker Dave Rayner nailing a 47-yard field goal. The Cowboys trailed with quarterback Shaun Hill making a 9-yard touchdown pass to wide receiver Nate Burleson, followed by a penalty on Leonard Davis which was enforced to the endzone for a safety. The Cowboys got the lead back with defensive back Bryan McCann returning a punt 97 yards for a touchdown, which was followed by Kitna making a 3-yard touchdown pass to wide receiver Miles Austin. The lead was narrowed with Hill completing a 14-yard touchdown pass to wide receiver Calvin Johnson. The Cowboys increased their lead with Kitna finding Austin again on a 4-yard touchdown pass, followed by Kitna's 29-yard scramble to the endzone for a touchdown, which was his longest run of his career.

Cowboys interim head coach Jason Garrett won his home debut and improved to 2–0 since taking over for Wade Phillips. It was the first time this season Dallas (3–7) had won consecutive games and the first time all season they won at home, having lost the first four. The Lions (2–8) lost their 26th straight on the road, extending a woeful NFL record that began in 2007, when Kitna was their quarterback. Detroit led 12–7 and was consistently stuffing the Cowboys' offense midway through the third quarter when John Wedling jumped over the goal line and tapped a punt back into the field of play. It hopped up waist-high and right to McCann, and the speedster turned it into the second-longest punt return in franchise history – a week after a 101-yard interception return that was the longest in club history. With the win the Cowboys improved to 3–7 on the season.

Week 12: vs. New Orleans Saints
Thanksgiving Day game

The Cowboys hosted the Saints in their annual Thanksgiving Day game. The Cowboys trailed early with running back Chris Ivory getting a 3-yard touchdown run, followed by kicker Garrett Hartley getting a 50-yard field goal, and then by Ivory making a 6-yard touchdown run. The Cowboys cut the lead as kicker David Buehler got a 21-yard field goal, but the Saints replied as Hartley nailed a 45-yard field goal. The Cowboys tried to come back as Buehler hit a 53-yard field goal, followed by Miles Austin getting a 60-yard touchdown run. The Cowboys trailed further with Hartley making a 28-yard field goal, but took the lead with Marion Barber III and Tashard Choice getting a 1-yard touchdown run. They failed to maintain this lead when quarterback Drew Brees completed a 12-yard touchdown pass to wide receiver Lance Moore.

With the loss, Dallas fell to 3–8.

Week 13: at Indianapolis Colts

Hoping to rebound from their loss to the Super Bowl champion Saints, the Cowboys played against the Super Bowl runners-up Colts at Lucas Oil Stadium. The Cowboys commanded the first quarter when Tashard Choice got a 20-yard touchdown run, followed by kicker David Buehler nailing a 30-yard field goal. In the second quarter, the Cowboys increased their lead as cornerback Orlando Scandrick returned an interception 40 yards for a touchdown. The lead was narrowed when quarterback Peyton Manning made a 13-yard touchdown pass to wide receiver Pierre Garçon, followed in the third quarter by Manning getting a 34-yard touchdown pass to wide receiver Reggie Wayne. The Cowboys extended their lead with Buehler hitting a 46-yard field goal, followed by Sean Lee returning an interception 31 yards for a touchdown. They trailed slightly as RB Javarris James got a 1-yard touchdown run, followed by Mat McBriar's punt getting blocked and returned 2 yards for a touchdown by Taj Smith. They replied to get the lead back as quarterback Jon Kitna completed a 2-yard touchdown pass to tight end Jason Witten (With a successful 2-point conversion as Kitna passed to wide receiver Roy E. Williams), but the game was tied when James got a 2-yard touchdown run. In overtime, Manning threw his fourth interception, (which totalled 11 interceptions in three consecutive games.) to linebacker Sean Lee, which soon converted into a successful 38-yard field goal attempt by Buehler, giving the Cowboys the win.

With the win, the Cowboys improved to 4–8.

Week 14: vs. Philadelphia Eagles

Coming off their win over the Colts, the Cowboys went home for a Week 14 NFC East duel with the Philadelphia Eagles on Sunday night. Dallas trailed early in the first quarter as Eagles quarterback Michael Vick got a 1-yard touchdown run. The Cowboys answered with quarterback Jon Kitna finding tight end Jason Witten on a 1-yard touchdown pass. The Eagles regained the lead in the second quarter with Vick completing a 1-yard touchdown pass to offensive guard Todd Herremans. Afterwards, Dallas closed out the half with a 50-yard field goal from kicker David Buehler.

The Cowboys took the lead in the third quarter with Buehler's 43-yard field goal, followed by a 3-yard touchdown run from running back Felix Jones. Philadelphia struck back with kicker David Akers getting a 39-yard field goal. The Eagles took the lead again in the fourth quarter with Akers booting a 50-yard field goal, followed by Vick completing a 91-yard touchdown pass to wide receiver DeSean Jackson and Akers making a 28-yard field goal. Dallas tried to rally as Kitna hooked up with Witten again on a 22-yard touchdown pass, yet the Eagles held on for the win.

With the loss, the Cowboys clinched their first losing season since 2004 and fell to 4–9. Also with this loss, they were eliminated from playoff contention.

Week 15: vs. Washington Redskins

The Cowboys' fourteenth game was an NFC East rivalry rematch against the Redskins at home. In the first quarter the Cowboys took the lead with kicker David Buehler hitting a 42-yard field goal, followed by quarterback Jon Kitna throwing a 3-yard touchdown pass to wide receiver Miles Austin; then Buehler made a 20-yard field goal to put Dallas up 13–0. The lead was narrowed when quarterback Rex Grossman completed a 19-yard touchdown pass to running back Ryan Torain, but the Cowboys increased their lead with Kitna making a 14-yard touchdown pass to tight end Jason Witten, followed by running back Tashard Choice getting a 3-yard touchdown run. The Redskins replied with Grossman getting a 10-yard touchdown pass to wide receiver Santana Moss, but the Cowboys scored again with Buehler got a 20-yard field goal. Washington managed to tie the game with Grossman finding Moss on a 5-yard touchdown pass. The Cowboys managed to get the win after Buehler made a 39-yard field goal, settling both records at 5–9.

Week 16: at Arizona Cardinals

With the loss, the Cowboys fell to 5–10.

Week 17: at Philadelphia Eagles

The Cowboys' final game was an NFC East rivalry rematch against the Eagles. In the 2nd quarter the Cowboys trailed early as quarterback Kevin Kolb threw a 4-yard touchdown pass to wide receiver Chad Hall, but they tied the game after outside linebackrt DeMarcus Ware recovered a fumble 17 yards for a touchdown. They trailed slightly with kicker David Akers hitting a 43 and a 22-yard field goal, but the Cowboys fought back with quarterback Stephen McGee completing a 4-yard touchdown pass to tight end Jason Witten (with the extra point good to take the lead and the win).

With the win, Dallas finished with a 6–10 record.

References

External links
 2010 Dallas Cowboys
 Pro Football Hall of Fame
 Dallas Cowboys Official Site

Dallas Cowboys
Dallas Cowboys seasons
Dallas
2010s in Dallas